Die Hard: Original Motion Picture Soundtrack is the soundtrack for John McTiernan's 1988 action film Die Hard starring Bruce Willis, that features an original score composed by Michael Kamen and incorporates diegetic music pieces. It has been critically acclaimed and assessed as one of Kamen's best works in film music and won him a BMI TV/Film Music Award for his work on the score.

The album was not officially released alongside the film, until 2002, when Varèse Sarabande issued a 21-track album featuring Kamen's score. It was then reissued in November 2011 by La-La Land Records, that consisted the full score packed into a two-disc set into a limited edition of 3,500 units, and again reissued in March 2017 of over 2,000 units. 

In November 2018, La-La Land Records released Die Hard: 30th Anniversary Remastered Edition featuring additional cues and demos, and sold over 5,000 units.

Background 
Kamen initially saw a mostly incomplete version of Die Hard and was unimpressed, as he saw the film as primarily about a "phenomenal bad guy" who made McClane seem less important. He was initially dismissive of film scores, believing they could not stand alone from the film, until he agreed to do so. His original score incorporates pizzicato and arco strings, brass, woodwinds and sleigh bells added during moments of menace to counter their festive meaning. 

The score incorporates diegetic music, which includes the Beethoven's 9th Symphony (commonly known as "Ode to Joy") and the classical piece of Brandenburg Concerto No. 3 by Johann Sebastian Bach, along with film score cues include James Horner's unused score for Aliens (1986) and cues from Man on Fire (1987). The score further references "Let It Snow! Let It Snow! Let It Snow!", "Singin' in the Rain" (1952), "Winter Wonderland" (1934), and "Christmas in Hollis" by Run-DMC, which would go on to be considered a Christmas classic, in part because of its use in the film.

Original release 
The album was first issued in February 2002 by Varèse Sarabande. It featured only 21 tracks that are heard from the film's score, including an instrumental arrangement of Jule Styne and Sammy Cahn's song "Let It Snow! Let It Snow! Let It Snow!". The rest of the score is not being included.

Reissues

2011 reissue 
La-La Land Records reissued and released the full score album on November 29, 2011 in a two-disc set. The album featured 39 tracks that included the score cues and few musical references heard in the film. The bonus tracks included variations of the score, that are either alternates or mono sources of the existing cues.

2017 reissue 
The album was again reissued by La-La Land Records and released on March 31, 2017.

30th Anniversary Remastered Edition 
In 2018, coinciding with the 30th anniversary of the film's release, a remastered edition of Kamen's score was announced by La-La Land Records and set for release on November 5, 2018 in a three-disc set that contains 74 tracks. The album featured the full score, including cues and existing pieces of diegetic music referenced in the film, while multiple variations of the score which includes, source music, alternatives and mixes heard in the film being included in the album. It also included previously unreleased material from Kamen's score in full or partially heard in existing cues.

 Notes
  Previously unreleased
  Contains originally unreleased material

Reception 
Robert Lockard of the Deja Reviewer mentioned "The music in Die Hard is adequate, but it's nothing special. It's ironic for a film that took so many chances and got so much right to go so middle-of-the-road with its soundtrack." Mfiles wrote "It's a rare action score that blends sincerity and self-parody in a manner that never compromises its respective movie, although one suspects McTiernan dialled down some of Kamen's more eccentric flourishes for that very reason... This review is a testament not only to a great Christmas movie and score, but also to both of their formidable legacies." James Southall of Movie Wave wrote "it's easy to see why it came about – Die Hard in particular is a fearsomely complex work that (somewhat against the odds, for reasons explained later) works simply brilliantly in the film and became one of the most influential scores of its time."

Jonathan Broxton believed Die Hard to be one of Kamen's best action music compositions. He praised "the clever combination of the themes, the interpolation of the classical music and the songs, and the rich and vivid action set pieces". Broxton summarised it as "an iconic 1980s action score which demands attention." Neil Shurley of AllMusic called it as an "outstanding presentation of a seminal score". Soundtrack Beat wrote "Kamen's score masterfully builds suspense, propelling all the plot's high-octane action while enriching the characterizations."

Filmtracks.com wrote "Kamen's score is defined by a series of repeated, pseudo- Western and pseudo-oriental riffs on acoustic guitar and lightly jingling bells representing the holidays... Kamen's music for Die Hard doesn't translate well onto album... Only once the party really begins, and the Plaza is under siege by the ineffectual police and FBI force, does Kamen's score begin to hold its own. The same applies to the score's revisitation of that mode in its end credits... the weak early and middle portions of the Die Hard score function to basic degrees in the film, sometimes as mere sound effects, and the movie might have succeeded just as well with outright parody adaptations of Christmas carols."

Personnel 

 Michael Kamen – composer, conductor
 Daniel Hersch – music editor, mastering
 Robert Townson – executive producer
 Armin Steiner – mixing
 Hollywood Studio Symphony – orchestra
 Bruce Babcock – orchestration
 Chris Boardman – orchestration
 Fi Trench – orchestration
 Philip Giffin – orchestration
 Nick Redman – album producer
 Stephen McLaughlin – music producer
 Christopher Brooks – supervising music editor
 Michael McDonald – music transfers

References

Citations

Works cited 
 
 
 
 

2002 soundtrack albums
Die Hard
Varèse Sarabande soundtracks
La-La Land Records soundtracks
Michael Kamen albums
Electronic soundtracks
Rock soundtracks
Heavy metal soundtracks